Saue is a town in north-western Estonia. It's the administrative centre of Saue Parish in Harju County.

Closest centres are Tallinn, Keila, Saku and Laagri.

Geography 
Saue is located at a very favourable position near Tallinn, the capital of Estonia. It lures a lot of moderately wealthy people who like the balance between the small town and big city atmosphere. While Saue is close to nature, it still provides the kinds of entertainment, jobs, and other big city amenities that Tallinn has to offer.

History 
1620s – Saue manor (Klein-Sauß) was established
1792 - The current manor house was built
1870 - The Saint Petersburg–Tallinn–Paldiski railway passing Saue was completed
1920s – Garden settlement started to arise
1960s – Saue was united with Tallinn
1973 – Saue, still part of Tallinn, gained a borough (alev) status
1993 – Saue was granted the town rights
1994 – Saue was separated from Tallinn and given a separate urban municipality status
2017 – Saue town, Saue Parish, Kernu Parish and Nissi Parish were united and a new Saue Parish was formed

Population 
93% of the people living in Saue are ethnic Estonians. The average age of people is 35. Over the years, the census of the population has shown that the population is slowly growing. In 1959 there were 1,088 people living in Saue, by 1970 it had increased to 1,979. In 1979 it was 3,293, in 1989 the population was 4,395, in 1995 it was 4,492 and finally, by 2000, the population was 4,996.

Economy 

Transport 
Saue has a stop on the Tallinn-Keila railway line (serviced by Elron), as well as bus connections and fixed-route taxis.

Saue Manor 

Saue Manor traces its origins to at least the 17th century. The current building was erected when the estate was owned by Friedrich Hermann von Fersen. The architect was very probably Johann Schultz, who was also the architect behind the baroque extension of Toompea Castle, Tallinn. The manor house complex is one of the finest examples of baroque manor house architecture in Estonia.

The exterior of the main house is characterised by a ground storey with rustications and a pilastered main floor. Wings (a stable-coach house and a granary) are linked to the main building via arched walls. The remains of a baroque park surrounds the manor, with noteworthy details such as sculptures of Heracles and Hera, and baroque sculptured reliefs.

The interior is noteworthy for its very rich display of stucco decorations of high quality in late baroque-early neoclassicist style. Stucco decorations adorn all the main rooms of the manor. Additionally, there are fine baroque cocklestoves in the manor.

Notable people 
Ingemar Teever (born 1983), football player

References

External links 

Saue manor official site
Saue manor at Estonian Manors Portal
Saue manor picture gallery at Visit Estonia

Populated places in Harju County
Former municipalities of Estonia
Cities and towns in Estonia
Manor houses in Estonia